The Indian Super League (ISL), officially known as the Hero Indian Super League for sponsorship reasons, is an Indian professional league for men's association football clubs. At the top of the Indian football league system, it is the country's primary football competition, organised by the All India Football Federation (AIFF) and their commercial partners Football Sports Development Limited (FSDL).

The league currently comprises 11 clubs. Each season of the tournament generally runs from October to March. During the league stage of the competition, each club plays against all the other clubs in a round-robin style. At the end of the league stage, the team with the most points gets declared the Premiers and presented with a trophy named League Winners Shield, along with the runners up to play in the play-offs, while the next best four clubs qualify to play qualifying playoffs to join the top two in the playoffs. The season then culminates with the ISL Final to determine the Champions who are presented with the ISL Trophy.

The competition was founded on 21 October 2013 with the aim of growing the sport of football in India and increasing its exposure in the country. The league began in October 2014 with eight teams. During its first three seasons, the competition operated without official recognition from the Asian Football Confederation (AFC), the governing body for the sport in Asia. The competition was also structured along the same lines as the Indian Premier League, the country's premier Twenty20 franchise-based cricket competition. Each season lasted just 3 months, from October to December, and matches were held daily. However, before the 2017–18 season, the league expanded to ten teams, expanded its schedule to six months, and earned recognition from the AFC.

The league stage winners participates directly in the AFC Champions League and the ISL Final winner participates in the AFC Cup qualifying-playoffs.

Since the league's inaugural season, a total of six clubs have been crowned as the Champions: ATK (3), Chennaiyin (2), Bengaluru (1), Mumbai City (1), Hyderabad (1) and ATK Mohun Bagan (1). Since the introduction of League Winners Shield in 2019–20 season, Mumbai City has won it twice while Jamshedpur and Goa have won one each.

History

Origins
Football in India has existed in many forms since the game first arrived in the country during the 19th century with the first nationwide club competition, the Durand Cup, beginning in 1888. Despite India's early history in the game, the country's first nationwide football league did not begin until the semi-professional National Football League commenced in 1996. Before the creation of the National Football League, most clubs played in state leagues or select nationwide tournaments.

In 2006, the All India Football Federation, the governing body for the sport in India, reformatted the league as the I-League in an effort to professionalise the game. However, during the following seasons, the league suffered from a lack of popularity due to poor marketing.

In September 2006, the AIFF signed a 10-year television and media contract with Zee Sports. The deal would make Zee broadcast the National Football League, later the I-League, and other tournaments organised by the AIFF and selected India's international matches. However, in October 2010, the deal between the AIFF and Zee Sports was terminated after differences between both parties related to payment and marketing of football in India.

On 9 December 2010, it was announced that the AIFF had signed a new 15-year, ₹700 crore deal with Reliance Industries and the International Management Group.

Foundation
The Indian Super League was officially launched on 21 October 2013 by IMG–Reliance, Star Sports, and the All India Football Federation. The competition was announced to take place from January 2014 to March 2014, but was postponed shortly thereafter to September 2014.

At first, it was announced that bidding for the eight Indian Super League teams would be completed before the end of 2013 and there were already high interest from big corporations, Indian Premier League teams, Bollywood stars, and other consortium. However, due to the rescheduling of the league, the bidding was moved to 3 March 2014. It was also revealed around this time that bidders would need to comply with financial requirements as well as promotion for football developments within their area. Finally, in early April 2014, the winning bidders were announced. The selected cities/states were Bangalore, Delhi, Goa, Guwahati, Kochi, Kolkata, Mumbai, and Pune. Former India cricket player Sachin Tendulkar, along with PVP Ventures, won the bidding for the Kochi franchise. Another former Indian cricket player, Sourav Ganguly, along with a group of Indian businessmen and La Liga side Atlético Madrid, won the bid for the Kolkata franchise. Meanwhile, Bollywood stars John Abraham, Ranbir Kapoor, and Salman Khan won the bid for the Guwahati, Mumbai, and Pune franchises respectively. Bangalore and Delhi were won by companies while Goa was won by a partnership between Videocon, Dattaraj Salgaocar, and I-League side Dempo.

The first team to be launched officially was the Kolkata franchise as Atlético de Kolkata on 7 May 2014. On 7 July 2014, the team announced the first head coach in league history, Antonio López Habas. The next day, Kolkata also announced the first official marquee signing in the Indian Super League, UEFA Champions League winner Luis García.

Eventually, all eight teams were revealed as Atlético de Kolkata, Bangalore Titans, Delhi Dynamos, Goa, Kerala Blasters, Mumbai City, NorthEast United and Pune City. However, on 21 August 2014, it was announced that due to Bangalore's owners dropping out, Chennai would be given a franchise instead. The team was eventually named Chennaiyin FC. At the same time, the original marquee players were Luis García, Elano, Alessandro Del Piero, Robert Pires, David James, Freddie Ljungberg, Joan Capdevila, and David Trezeguet.

The inaugural season began on 12 October 2014 at the Salt Lake Stadium when Atlético de Kolkata defeated Mumbai City, 3–0. The first goal was scored by Fikru Teferra. The first Indian to score in the league was Balwant Singh for Chennaiyin FC.

Recognition and expansion (2014–2021)

For the first three seasons of the Indian Super League, the competition operated without official recognition from the governing body for football in Asia, the Asian Football Confederation (AFC), and FIFA, the world governing body. In October 2014, then FIFA General Secretary Jérôme Valcke stated that the world governing body only recognised the ISL as a tournament, not a league. The official league for football in India remained the I-League. With no recognition from the AFC, the teams also couldn't participate in Asian club competitions, the AFC Champions League or the AFC Cup.

During the first three seasons of the Indian Super League, attendances across the competition had exceeded the expectations of pundits and of the domestic I-League mainly due to the timings at which the matches took place especially on working days and needs no mention sheer promotion. Television ratings were also strong for the competition, which is expected after better commentary, better telecasting, pre-match and post-match shows, as well as hourly reminders in various channels and social media interaction. However, despite the general success off the pitch, the competition drew criticism in other areas. Due to the need to accommodate the ISL into the Indian football calendar, the I-League season was shortened and went from having an October to May schedule to January to May schedule. Indian players would play for both an ISL team and an I-League club while the I-League continued to suffer from lack of visibility compared to the ISL. India's then head coach Stephen Constantine had called for both the ISL and I-League to either run together at the same time or merge.

For the first three seasons Atlético de Kolkata emerged as the dominant team by finishing in the top four every year, and winning the Final twice (2014 and 2016) by defeating Kerala Blasters both times.

On 18 May 2016, IMG–Reliance, along with the AIFF and I-League representatives met at a meeting in Mumbai. During the meeting, it was proposed that starting from the 2017–18 season, the Indian Super League become the top-tier football league in India while the I-League be reformed as League One and be relegated to the second division. The competition would also expand by two teams and continue to operate without promotion and relegation, as stated earlier due to the 15 crore attraction of the FSDL each year, but run for 5–7 months instead of 2–3. The idea was not entertained by the I-League representatives.

In June 2017, IMG–Reliance, the AIFF and the I-League representatives met with the AFC in Kuala Lumpur in order to find a new way forward for Indian football. The AFC were against allowing the ISL as the main league in India, while I-League clubs East Bengal and Mohun Bagan wanted a complete merger of the ISL and I-League. A couple weeks later, the AIFF proposed that both Indian Super League and I-League run simultaneously on a short–term basis with the I-League champion retaining the AFC Champions League qualifying stage spot and the AFC Cup qualifying stage spot going to the ISL champion. The proposal from the AIFF was officially approved by the AFC on 25 July 2017, with the ISL replacing the domestic cup competition, the Federation Cup, which was a true knockout cup competition It was also stated that the competition would now run for five months starting with the 2017–18 season and the competition would expand to 10 teams.

A month before, on 11 May 2017, the ISL organisers started to accept bids for 2–3 new franchises for the 2017–18 season. The bids would be for ten cities, namely Ahmedabad, Bangalore, Cuttack, Durgapur, Hyderabad, Jamshedpur, Kolkata, Ranchi, Siliguri and Thiruvananthapuram. It was also clarified that if Kolkata were to win at least one bid that the new Kolkata side would have to play away from the city for only two seasons. A month later, on 12 June, it was announced that I-League side, Bengaluru, and Tata Steel (for Jamshedpur) had won the bidding for the new teams.

On 22 September 2017, the competition announced officially that it would be expanding its season by two months, thus making the league last for five months instead of three. The competition would also go from having matches played daily to being played between Wednesday and Sunday.

The next year, before the 2018–19 season, it was reported that Reliance Industries had bought out IMG's shares in the Football Sports Development. IMG realising that the robust business model will soon be exposed, pulled out, thus giving Reliance Industries 65% ownership while Star Sports retains 35%. In this season, Bengaluru had achieved the feat of being the first club to win the final after topping the league standings. Following the 2018–19 season, Pune City was disbanded in 2019. The club's franchise rights were then transferred to an ownership group which founded Hyderabad FC. In August 2019, Delhi Dynamos became the first ISL club to relocate when it moved from Delhi to Bhubaneswar and rebranded as Odisha FC.

On 14 October 2019, the AFC held a summit in Kuala Lumpur, chaired by the AFC Secretary General Windsor John, which involved key stakeholders from the AIFF, the FSDL, the ISL and the I-League clubs, and other major stakeholders to propose a new roadmap to facilitate the football league system in India. Based on the roadmap, that was prepared by the AFC and the AIFF at the summit and approved by the AFC Executive Committee on 26 October in Da Nang, in 2019–20 season Indian Super League will attain the country's top-tier league status and run parallelly with I-League, allowing the Indian Super League premiers to play in AFC Champions League and the I-League champions to play in AFC Cup. In addition, starting with the 2022–23 and 2023–2024 season, I-League will lose the top-tier league status and Indian Super League will become the sole top division, wherein the champion of the I-League will stand a chance to be promoted to the Indian Super League with no participation fee, basis fulfilling sporting merit and the national club licensing criteria to be set out by the AIFF, but there won't be relegation from Indian Super League at this time. In its recommendation for 2024–25, it was agreed to fully implement promotion and relegation in between the two leagues, and abolition of two parallel leagues. In accordance to the general league system, the club finishing at the top of the table was crowned as the season's premier, and Goa became the first to achieve the title in 2019–20 season.

Another key recommendation by the AFC in the roadmap was to open a pathway for two I-League clubs’ entry into Indian Super League by the end of the 2020-21 season, subject to the criteria being fulfilled. Therefore, efforts were taken early on by the organisers to include the two historic clubs– Mohun Bagan and East Bengal into the league, which succeeded in the following season. Before the start of the 2020–21 season, the owners of ATK merged its brand with the football section of Mohun Bagan to become ATK Mohun Bagan on 1 June 2020 and entered the league. On 27 September 2020, after securing investment from Shree Cement, East Bengal joined the league as an expansion team, thus becoming 11th team in the league.

Sole top-tier league status (2022–present)
Following the Indian football roadmap, Indian Super League become the sole top-tier league in the country from 2022–23 season.

Competition format

Regular season
The regular season of Indian Super League runs from October to late February or early March (since the 2017–18 season). The competition consists of 22 rounds that follows a double round-robin format, with each club playing the others twice, once at their home stadium and once at their opponents' stadium, for a total of 20 matches each. Teams receive three points for a win, one point for a draw, and no points for a loss. Teams are ranked by total points, with the highest-ranked club at the end of the regular season being crowned ISL Premiers and awarded the League Winners Shield (introduced during 2019–20 season).

At the completion of the regular season, the team with the most points gets declared the Premiers and presented with a trophy named League Winners Shield, along with the runners-up to play in the playoffs. At the same time, the following best four clubs qualify to play qualifying playoffs to join the top two in the playoffs. The position of each team is determined by the highest number of points accumulated during the regular season. If two or more teams are level on points, the following criteria are applied in order until one of the teams can be determined as the higher ranked:

 Highest number of points accumulated in matches between the teams concerned;
 Highest goal difference in matches between the teams concerned;
 Highest number of goals scored in matches between the teams concerned;
 Highest goal difference
 Highest number of goals scored
 Lowest number of red cards accumulated;
 Lowest number of yellow cards accumulated;
 Toss of a coin.

The Indian Super League had approved the 3+1 rule to help local players actively participate in the league. The rule is a part of the ISL guidelines from the eighth edition 2021–22. The new rule allowed 7 Indian players to be a part of the starting XI.

Playoffs 

The top six clubs at the conclusion of the regular season progress to the ISL playoffs. The playoffs culminate with the ISL final, where the winner is presented with the ISL Cup. In the qualifiers, the third-through-sixth ranked teams play a single-elimination match hosted at the higher ranked team's venue, with the two winners of those matches joining the first and second ranked teams in two-legged semifinals played over two weeks (since 2022–23). The two winners of those matches eventually meet in the final hosted at a pre-decided venue.

Continental qualification 

Indian Super League teams can qualify for the top Asian club competitions – the AFC Champions League and AFC Cup – through their performance in the league. Before the 2017–18 season, the league was not recognised officially by the Asian Football Confederation (AFC), the governing body for football in Asia, so for the first three seasons no ISL team was eligible to participate in Asian competition. However, in June 2017, it was announced that the AFC, along with FIFA, would recognise the Indian Super League and allow clubs to participate in the AFC Cup starting in 2019.

Bengaluru became the first Indian Super League club to play in Asian competition when they participated in the 2018 AFC Cup. The club qualified while still an I-League club and through winning the Federation Cup in 2017 but participated in the tournament as an ISL team after entering the league before the 2017–18 season. In March 2018, Chennaiyin became the first ISL side to qualify for the AFC Cup directly through the league. They qualified for the 2019 edition after winning the 2018 ISL final.

In October 2019, it was announced that the AFC had approved the proposed roadmap from the All India Football Federation, which includes allowing the Indian Super League champion to qualify for the AFC Champions League qualifiers. A couple months later, in December 2019, it was officially announced by the AFC that they would be expanding the Champions League group stage from 32 teams to 40 and that the Indian Super League premier shall qualify directly for the group stage from the 2021 edition onwards. In total 3 spots in AFC club competitions are awarded to India based on the AFC Club Competitions Ranking, including one for the winner of the Indian Super League Final in the AFC Cup qualifying play-offs and one for the champions of I-League, the other top-tier league, in the AFC Cup group stage. In February 2020, Goa became the first ISL club to qualify for the Champions League after they became the ISL Premiers of 2019–20. Since 2022–23 season, I-League ceased to be a top-tier league, hence the AFC Cup group stage spot is now awarded to the winners of Super Cup.

Updated on 5 October 2022
Notes:

Other competitions 

In February 2018 it was announced by the All India Football Federation that the Super Cup would be replacing the Federation Cup as Indian football's annual knockout football competition. Before the Super Cup, Indian Super League clubs did not play official matches outside of ISL (exception being Bengaluru in the 2018 AFC Cup) so the Super Cup was the first time clubs in the league played in an official cup tournament. The Super Cup was contested by all ten sides in the ISL and the top 10 sides from the I-League, the other top flight league in India, during its initial seasons. The top six teams from both leagues qualify automatically for the tournament proper while the bottom four participate in qualifiers. Till now, both the editions of the tournament has been won by ISL clubs; namely Bengaluru and Goa.

From 2019 onward, ISL clubs began to participate in Durand Cup on invitation. ATK, Bengaluru, Chennaiyin, Goa and Jamshedpur were the first ones to participate in the tournament, and 2019 Durand Cup was eventually declared as the de facto domestic cup tournament for that season after Super Cup was cancelled due to COVID-19 pandemic. In its next edition, Goa became the first club from ISL to win the cup. From 2022 onwards, AIFF and FSDL made it mandatory for all the clubs to participate in the Durand Cup, commencing at the beginning of every football season, thereby to fulfil the minimum number of games played by top-tier clubs set by AFC.

Reliance Foundation Development League

In June 2021 it was proposed by the organisers of ISL after a meeting with the CEOs of all the ISL clubs, that a new developmental league, called Reliance Foundation Development League, would be introduced in 2022. This new league would consist of the youth and reserve teams of all the ISL clubs, with aim to develop young players as there has been limited number of competitions and leagues outside the ISL since the pandemic. The teams would predominantly feature U-21 players with few overage players allowed as well. The inaugural season of the proposed two-month league was to be held in Goa inside a bio-secure bubble between January and March, following the same medical and safety procedures for 2021–22 ISL season, but got postponed to April 15. Out of all the ISL clubs, ATK Mohun Bagan, East Bengal, NorthEast United and Odisha didn't participate due to lack of youth teams, thus only seven clubs took part in the league along with Reliance Foundation Youth Champs football team. The league concluded on 12 May with Bengaluru topping the table and becoming the inaugural champions. Along with Bengaluru, Kerala Blasters qualified for Premier League's NextGen Cup 2022 in the UK as the top two teams in the league.

Proposed League system Vision 2047

2023 - 2026 
AIFF has broken down ‘Vision 2047’ into six four-year strategic plans. The first of these will look to cover the period till 2026. According this plan in 2026 Indian football season 40 clubs will participate in ISL(14 clubs), I-League (14 clubs) and I-League-2 (12clubs). Moreover 60 clubs will participate in 5 zonal leagues with minimum 12 teams in each zone. 

How ever AIFF's new strategic plan 2026, the number of teams in the current leagues needs to be increased. By the 2026 season, ILeague-2 will have to be rebranded to a full league format with at least 12 teams with relegation and promotion. In 2026 season onwards State FA league champions won't promote directly to I-League2. SFA champions will promote their respective Zonal league and Then each Zonal league champions will play I-League-2 qualifier.

Clubs
The Indian Super League is currently contested by 11 clubs. A total of 13 clubs have participated in the Indian Super League since its inception in 2014. Most of the clubs that have contested in this league were founded as franchise teams for the league. Six of these clubs have been competing in this league since its inaugural season. The league started with just 8 teams but has now expanded to 11 sides participating in it every season. The 8 original clubs included Atlético de Kolkata (renamed as ATK FC), Chennaiyin, Delhi Dynamos (rebranded as Odisha FC), Goa, Kerala Blasters, Mumbai City, NorthEast United and Pune City. In the 2017-18 Indian Super League season two new teams, Bengaluru who entered the league after having a successful spell in I-League and Jamshedpur, a newly formed franchise club, made their debut in the league, increasing the number of participating teams from 8 to 10. At the end of the 2018-19 Indian Super League season, Pune City announced that it will be shutting down its operations. It was the first club in the history of the league to stop its operations. Its place was taken up by Hyderabad who took their place in the succeeding season. In the same season Delhi Dynamos relocated to Bhubaneswar and rebranded itself as Odisha FC. In 2020, the demand for the two Kolkata giants - East Bengal and Mohun Bagan - to be playing in Indian Super League increased. Following reports of Mohun Bagan strugling financially, the decision of merging the football division of the club with ATK was taken and a new entity ATK Mohun Bagan was formed to take its place in the league. In September 2020, East Bengal officially announced that it will be participating in the 2020-21 Indian Super League season. This increased the number of teams to 11 where it sits currently. From the 2023-24 season, the league will see its first promoted club from the I-League, RoundGlass Punjab FC, following the reorganisation of Indian football and having promotion integrated into the league, taking the total amount of clubs to 12.

Current clubs
The following 12 clubs will be participating in the 2023–24 Indian Super League.

Timeline

Championships

As of the end of the 2021–22 season, 13 clubs have competed in the league, with five becoming Champions and three earning the League Winners Shield. ATK still remain as the most successful team in ISL with three championships and Mumbai City remain as the most successful team in League Winners Shield with 2 titles, while no team has successfully defended their titles till now. Mumbai City is the only club to have won the double, becoming the Champions as well as the Premiers during the 2020–21 season.

Championship and premiership by years

Championships and premierships by clubs

Ownership

Just like the Indian Premier League, the Indian Super League has a similar ownership model where the teams are owned by prominent businessmen, as well as celebrity owners from Bollywood and cricket. The Indian Super League owners act as the competition's "League Partners". British professional services group, Ernst & Young, were hired to draw up a criterion for the team bidding process and they were required to approve the potential owners. In April 2014 the owners were announced. Bollywood stars such as Ranbir Kapoor, John Abraham, and Salman Khan were bid winners, as well as cricket stars Sachin Tendulkar and Sourav Ganguly. Football clubs such as Atlético Madrid and Shillong Lajong were also bid winners.

Despite careful selection, the Indian Super League has had trouble in the past with team ownership. In August 2014, two months before the inaugural season, Sun Group, the owners of the Bangalore franchise, dropped out of the competition after the competition rejected their potential tie-up with then I-League club Bengaluru FC. Later that month, it was announced that another Bollywood star, Abhishek Bachchan, would take over the last franchise spot and move the team from Bangalore to Chennai.

The competition had its first ownership switch within a team on 1 June 2016 when the Kerala Blasters announced their new ownership structure. Along with Sachin Tendulkar, the team brought in businessman Nimmagadda Prasad and film stars Allu Aravind, Chiranjeevi, and Nagarjuna after PVP Ventures withdrew their stake in the team. Later in 2018 Tendulkar sold off his shares to the majority stakeholders in the club.

Sponsorship and revenues
In 2014, Hero MotoCorp became the first title sponsor of the Indian Super League in a deal that would last through 2016. On 30 September 2014, a week before the first season, it was announced that Puma SE would be the official ball supplier of the Indian Super League. Nivia became the official match ball sponsor for the session 2018–19 and supplied FIFA pro certified Nivia Ashtang to be played through ten clubs.

The competition relies heavily on a central sponsorship pool. League stakeholders, Star Sports and IMG–Reliance, manage the central sponsorship pool and market the competition to potential investors and sponsors. Twenty per cent of the money gained in the central sponsorship pool goes towards organising the competition while the rest is divided among the teams. Despite successfully gaining a lot of money through central sponsorship in 2014, 100% of the revenues were used by the competition to improve infrastructure and facilities, which meant that the teams lost money during the first season. The next season saw a change, however, with the central sponsorship pool doubling to around 100 crore due to new competition–wide sponsorships with corporates such as Flipkart and DHL Express. Teams were also able to increase their intake in sponsorship in 2015 with shirt sponsorship deals worth double from the previous season and around nine advertisements allowed on team kits. Teams in the league had also signed shirt manufacturing sponsorship deals with companies such as Adidas and Puma.

For the 2016 season, it was projected that the competition would gain more sponsors compared to the previous season, especially since the competition would occur during the Indian festive periods. For kit sponsorships, each team is allowed to have six sponsorships on the kit, with teams like ATK regularly filling those spots.

On 23 July 2017 it was announced that Hero MotoCorp would extend their deal as the title sponsors of the Indian Super League for another three-years. The company would spend $25 million on the competition during those three years according to Nita Ambani, the league's chairperson.

Media coverage

Television ratings
Star Sports, one of the organisers of the Indian Super League, also serves as the official broadcasters of the league in India. In September 2014, it was announced that Star Sports would broadcast the ISL through eight channels in five languages in an attempt to reach 85% of the Indian television audience.

The first match of the Indian Super League, between Atlético de Kolkata and Mumbai City on 12 October 2014, reportedly drew a television audience of 75 million people. The first week reportedly drew 170 million people in total. These numbers were 12 times more than what India drew for the 2014 FIFA World Cup and around 20–30 times more than what the I-League, India's then top-tier football league, drew on TEN Action and even the English Premier League. Overall, at the end of the first season, it was reported that the ISL drew a total of 429 million viewers across India, just a bit lower than the Pro Kabaddi League, and two and a half times more than the FIFA World Cup. It was also reported that 57% of the viewers were women and children and that the Star Sports website gained 32 million visits during the tournament.

The league experienced a sharp growth in ratings after the 2016 season with over 216 million viewers on television throughout. The 2016 final between ATK and the Kerala Blasters reportedly drew 41 million viewers which was a 41% increase on the number of viewers who saw the 2015 final between Chennaiyin and Goa. Ratings in rural India meanwhile drew 101 million viewers.

For the 2017–18 season, Star Sports broadcast the league on Star Sports 2 and Star Sports 2HD in English. The broadcasters also televised the matches in Bangla, Malayalam, Kannada, Tamil and other languages through various channels. The league is also streamed online via Disney+ Hotstar, Star India's online streaming service, and Jio TV.

ISL 2019–20 season viewership recorded a 51 percent growth. At the end of the season, the league recorded a 51 per cent jump in viewership among the urban affluent sports savvy audience of M15+AB Urban as per BARC's report.

ISL 2020–21 season saw a growth of 16% pan-India viewership from last 2019–20 season's viewership numbers.

Broadcasters

Stadiums
Since the competition began in 2014, there have been a variety of stadiums used to host matches. Two stadiums, the DY Patil Stadium in Navi Mumbai and the Jawaharlal Nehru Stadium in Kochi, are mainly used as cricket stadiums. Three other stadiums are athletic stadiums which are primarily used to host football matches in the I-League: the Pandit Jawaharlal Nehru Stadium in Goa, the Vivekananda Yuba Bharati Krirangan (VYBK) in Kolkata, and the Balewadi Stadium in Pune. Three other venues were used which don't primarily host top-tier professional football: the Indira Gandhi Athletic Stadium in Assam, the Jawaharlal Nehru Stadium in Chennai, and the Jawaharlal Nehru Stadium in Delhi.

For the 2016 season, two new stadiums were used in the competition, the Mumbai Football Arena in Mumbai and the Rabindra Sarobar Stadium in Kolkata. The Mumbai Football Arena replaced the DY Patil Stadium for Mumbai City. ATK moved to the Rabindra Sarobar Stadium when the VYBK was being renovated for the 2017 FIFA U-17 World Cup.

For the 2017–18 season, ATK returned to the VYBK while the addition of Bengaluru and Jamshedpur added two new stadiums to the competition. Bengaluru would host matches at the Sree Kanteerava Stadium while Jamshedpur would play at the JRD Tata Sports Complex. Currently Jamshedpur is the only team to play at a self-owned stadium, although ATK Mohun Bagan and East Bengal have their respective self-owned stadiums– Mohun Bagan Ground and East Bengal Ground respectively, but they both prefer to use the VYBK to host matches.

Coaches

Managers or head coaches in the ISL are involved in day-to-day running of the team, including the training, team selection and player acquisition.Their influence varies from club-to-club and is related to the ownership of the club. An AFC 'Pro' Diploma license, which is the final coaching qualification available in AFC member nation, and follows the completion of the AFC 'B' Diploma and AFC 'A' Diploma licenses, or any equivalent coaching license is required by a head coach in ISL. Moreover, every head coach must have at least one Indian assistant coach who must also possess an AFC 'Pro' Diploma license, although an Indian goalkeeping coach is not considered as an assistant coach to fulfil the aforementioned criterion. Unqualified caretaker manager can be appointed to fill the gap between the managerial departure and a new appointment.

Historically ISL has seen a flurry of coaches incoming and outgoing each season, with most of the coaches serving for a season or two at a single club. Sergio Lobera is the longest serving coach in the league (970 days) with Goa, while Habas has been a coach in the league for the longest cumulative duration (1,906 days) serving at three clubs. Based on achievements, Lobera remains the most successful coach in ISL with the League Winner's Shield with Goa in 2019–20 and another of the Shield and the ISL Championship with Mumbai City in 2020–21.

Players

Appearances

Transfer regulations and foreign players

Player transfers may only take place within transfer windows set by the All India Football Federation and approved by the FIFA. The two transfer windows run from June 9 to August 31 and from January 1 to January 31. Player registrations cannot be exchanged outside these windows except under specific license from the AIFF, usually on an emergency basis; if a player is injured and ruled out for at least two months, the club can permanently replace him, also if the club terminates the contract of a registered player, then a replacement can be signed. Although loan transfers and registrations can take place even outside the transfer windows.

During the initial seasons, the no. of foreigners in a squad varied from 7–10, which was gradually reduced as the league achieved AFC and FIFA recognition, and the organisers emphasised more on developing Indian players. As of 2021–22, a club can have a maximum squad strength of 35 men, including at most 6 foreigners (1 of them must belong to an AFC member nation) and 3 registered goalkeepers. A club can also have an injury replacement for a domestic player. If a club registers less than 35 players by the end of the window, they can still fill the quota post the stipulated date provided the player is a free agent. FSDL also mandated the clubs to sign at least 4 under-21 players, with minimum 2 of them being a part of the matchday squad. Previously, it was also mandatory for the clubs to get the approval of the league for three of their foreign signings, wherein players who have played a minimum of 1000 minutes last season were automatically approved. But this rule was later scrapped and the clubs no longer need to approach the organisers for approval.

Top scorers 

Bold denotes players still playing in the Indian Super League,Italics denotes players still playing professional football.

Wages
Every club has to follow a squad salary cap of ₹16.5 crores (≈ $2.2 million), which includes individual performance bonus (exclusive of team bonus), agent/intermediary fee and other arrangements with the players, although loan wages and transfer fees are not included within the salary cap. A club has an option to sign a marquee player, through the League's approval, whose salary is excluded from the stated salary cap. Failing to follow the regulations, a club may risk deduction of points, possible fines and/or sanctions by the league.

Awards

Trophy
The Indian Super League cup was unveiled on 5 October 2014, by Nita Ambani, the founder and chairperson of Football Sports Development. At the trophy unveiling occasion, Mrs. Ambani said, "It's a momentous day for all of us today as I stand along with the world's footballing legends to unveil the pride of Indian Super League. As these role models have inspired hundreds of thousands of players worldwide, I am sure the ISL trophy will also stand as a symbol of aspiration for many youngsters in an emergent India". On 19 February 2020 the FSDL unveiled the League Winners Shield for the ISL premiers to be awarded from 2019–20 season onwards.

Designed by Frazer and Haws, the ISL cup stands 26 inches tall. The logo on the top band has the ISL colors assigned to it and the handles are ornately carved and embellished with 24 carats of gold gilt to imbue a sense of pride when held up. The League Winners' Shield, weighing approx. 5 kg with a diameter of 22 inches draws inspiration from global football traditions and design tones of the ISL cup. The wreath carved around the silver football symbolises the victors of The Beautiful Game.

Individual awards
In addition to the League Winners' Shield and the ISL Cup, the organisers also issue other awards throughout the season. A Man of the Match award, referred as the Hero of the Match due to sponsorship  reasons, is presented to the player who had the most impact in an individual match.

Monthly awards are also given for the Hero of the Month and Emerging Player of the Month. These are also issued at the conclusion of each season for the Hero of the League and the Emerging Player of the League

The Golden Boot is awarded to the top goalscorer of each season, the Winning Pass of the League award is presented to the top assist provider of each season and the Golden Glove is awarded to the goalkeeper with the most clean sheets in a season.

Partnerships

 The Indian Super League has a strategic partnership with the Premier League.
 ISL announced a landmark partnership with London-based Terra Virtua Limited to launch its exclusive Non-fungible token (NFT) as digital collectibles ahead of the 2021–22 season.
Indian Super League and South Asia's leading esports company NODWIN Gaming on 26 October 2021 announced the launch of eISL that effectively meant that Hero Indian Super League in collaboration with EA Sports became the country's first major sports league to venture into competitive gaming.

See also
 Sports in India
 I-League
 I-League 2
 Indian State Leagues
 Indian Women's League
 List of Indian football champions
 List of Indian Super League coaches
 India national football team
 Indian football clubs in Asian competitions
 2021–23 Indian football club competition play-offs for AFC
 History of Indian football
 IFA Shield

Notes

References

External links

 
All India Football Federation
2013 establishments in India
Professional sports leagues in India
Football leagues in India
Star Sports
Sports leagues established in 2013
India
Reliance Sports